Montgomery is an underground station on the Brussels Metro, the first station on the eastern branch of line 1 (formerly line 1B), in the Brussels-Capital Region, Belgium. The station also serves a number of tram lines and buses: Brussels tram routes 7 and 25 pass through, and 39 and 44 terminate there, while tram route 81 and a number of buses stop at surface level.

History
The metro station opened on 30 January 1975 and is named after the roundabout above (Square Maréchal Montgomery/Maarschalk Montgomeryplein), which in turn was named after Field Marshal Montgomery. It is located in the municipality of Woluwe-Saint-Pierre (Sint-Pieters-Woluwe).

Description
The trams' entrance is from the /; they exit to the Avenue de Tervueren/Tervurenlaan. The walls of the station are decorated with a large fresco by Jean-Michel Folon titled Magic City.

References

Brussels metro stations
Railway stations opened in 1975
Woluwe-Saint-Pierre